Yang Mi-kyung (born July 25, 1961) is a South Korean actress. She is best known for playing the role of palace lady-in-waiting Han Baek-young in the popular period drama series Dae Jang Geum (2003).

Other activities
Yang was also a visiting professor at Nagasaki Wesleyan University in 2011, and currently teaches Broadcasting and Entertainment as an adjunct professor at Induk University.

Filmography

Television series

Film

Variety/radio show

Theater

Books

Awards

References

External links
Yang Mi-kyung Fan Cafe at Daum

1961 births
Living people
South Korean television actresses
South Korean film actresses
Sogang University alumni